Johann Rudolf Huber (21 April 1668 – 28 February 1748) was an eminent Swiss portrait artist.  Among his famous subjects were Charles III William, Margrave of Baden-Durlach, Joseph I, Holy Roman Emperor and Albrecht von Haller .

Biography
Huber was born as the son of a landlord in Basel. There, in Bern, Venice and Rome he learned to paint. In 1699 he was appointed court painter at the court in Stuttgart. He did portraits of nearly 5,000 of his contemporaries. He died in Basel.

Huber was one of the most important Swiss painters of his time.

Sources 
 Register der Contrafeit so ich nach dem Leben gemahldt habe (1683–1718), Kunstmuseum Winterthur, doi:10.7891/e-manuscripta-48580

Further reading
 Maurice W. Brockwell, Catalogue of the pictures and other works of Art in the collection of Lord St. Oswald at Nostell Priory, London: 1915.
Matthew Pilkington, Henry Fuseli, A Dictionary of Painters from the revival of art to the present period, London: John Crowder 1805, p. 262 online
 Manuel Kehrli: Sein Geist ist zu allem fähig. Der Maler, Sammler und Kunstkenner Johann Rudolf Huber (1668-1748). Basel 2010. content
 Johann Rudolf Huber 1668-1748. Ein Maler der bernischen Gesellschaft zu Beginn des 18. Jahrhunderts. (Catalogue), Jegenstorf 1982.
 Johann Caspar Füssli: Geschichte der besten Künstler in der Schweitz. Bd. 2 Orell, Gessner und Comp., Zurich 1757, S. 212-223 online

Gallery

External links 
 
 

1668 births
1748 deaths
17th-century Swiss painters
Swiss male painters
18th-century Swiss painters
18th-century Swiss male artists
Swiss portrait painters